Rosemont is an unincorporated community in Taylor County, West Virginia, United States. Rosemont has a post office with ZIP code 26424.

References

Unincorporated communities in Taylor County, West Virginia
Unincorporated communities in West Virginia